WWiSE stands for World-Wide Spectrum Efficiency.

Two large industry "Pre-N" groups, the TGnSync Group and the World-Wide Spectrum Efficiency (WWiSE), have formed, and each espouses a different approach to achieving next-generation wireless technologies. WWiSE won the support of Texas Instruments, Broadcom, Conexant, STMicro, Airgo Networks and Bermai, and later Motorola. Leading the WWiSE group is Airgo Networks, which is headed by former Stanford researcher Greg Raleigh. Airgo is a chief proponent of MIMO (multiple in, multiple out) technology using multiple radios and multiple antennas. Its current chipset can currently be found in access points from Belkin and Linksys.

IEEE 802.11